Gildo Cunha do Nascimento (died 2 August 2019), known as Gildo, was a Brazilian professional footballer who played for Palmeiras, Flamengo and Athletico Paranaense.

References

Date of birth missing
2019 deaths
Brazilian footballers
Sociedade Esportiva Palmeiras players
CR Flamengo footballers
Club Athletico Paranaense players
Association footballers not categorized by position